|}

The City of York Stakes is a Group 2 flat horse race in Great Britain open to horses aged three years or older. It is run at York over a distance of 7 furlongs (1,408 metres), and it is scheduled to take place each year in August. It is currently held on the final day of York's four-day Ebor Festival meeting. The race was upgraded to Group 3 level from the 2016 running, having previously been a run as a Listed race. It was upgraded to Group 2 level from the 2019 running.

Winners since 1988

See also
 Horse racing in Great Britain
 List of British flat horse races

References

 Paris-Turf: 
 Racing Post:

 horseracingintfed.com – International Federation of Horseracing Authorities – City of York Stakes (2018).

Flat races in Great Britain
York Racecourse
Open mile category horse races